Tyreik Samuel Wright (born 22 September 2001) is an Irish professional footballer who plays as a winger for Plymouth Argyle.

Wright is a product of the Aston Villa Academy, having signed as a junior from Irish youth side Lakewood Athletic. He has played on loan at League Two sides Walsall, Salford City, Colchester United and Bradford City and has represented the Republic of Ireland at youth levels up to under-21.

Club career

Aston Villa 
Wright is from Ovens, County Cork and began his career with local club Lakewood at the age of 5, before signing for English club Aston Villa in July 2018.

He moved on loan to Walsall on 13 January 2021. On 23 January, Wright made his professional debut in a 3–1 away league victory against Port Vale.

On 6 July 2021, Wright was amongst several Academy players who were given new professional contracts, and on 17 August, Wright joined Salford City in League Two on a season-long loan. He made his Salford City debut the same day, as a substitute in a 2–1 defeat to Crawley Town. On 28 August, he scored his first professional goal in Salford's 3–0 home win against Newport County, opening the scoring in the first minute of his side's first win of the season. He was recalled from his loan on 14 January 2022.

On 31 January 2022, he moved on loan to Colchester United. He made his Colchester United debut on 5 February, in a 1–0 away victory over Leyton Orient. On 12 February, Wright scored his first goal for Colchester, in a 2–2 League Two draw against Carlisle United.

On 1 September 2022, Wright returned to League Two when he joined Bradford City on loan until the end of the 2022–23 season. After two substitute appearances, he made his full debut on 17 September, scoring one goal and setting up another in a man-of-the-match display. In October 2022 local media said that his "form continues to impress".

Plymouth Argyle 
On 9 January 2023, Aston Villa recalled Wright from his Bradford City loan. Later that day he signed for Plymouth Argyle.

International career
He has played for the Republic of Ireland at under-17, under-18 and under-19 youth levels. He made his Republic of Ireland under-21 debut in a 2–1 win over Wales under-21 in March 2021. On 3 September 2021, Wright scored his first goal for Ireland under-21 in a 2023 UEFA European Under-21 Championship qualification match against Bosnia and Herzegovina.

He was recalled to the under-21 squad in September 2022, meaning he would miss one Bradford City game. He said he hoped to regain his club first-team place upon his return, after scoring one goal and setting up another in a man-of-the-match display. Wright missed a penalty as Ireland under-21s lost on penalties to Israel in the European Championship qualifying play-offs.

Playing style
Wright is known for his pace. His manager at Bradford, Mark Hughes, praised Wright for having "good awareness", noting that he is "calm in possession and keeps the ball".

Personal life
Wright has also played Gaelic football.

Wright is a Manchester United fan.

On 24 February 2021, Wright's loan club Walsall and parent club Aston Villa released joint statements condemning racist abuse that he had received on Instagram. The messages were reported to both the social media platform and West Midlands Police's Hate Crime Unit for investigation. On 27 September 2021, police charged a 17-year-old from the North East with sending the abusive messages under the Communications Act 2003.

Career statistics

External links

References

2001 births
Living people
Republic of Ireland association footballers
Aston Villa F.C. players
Walsall F.C. players
Salford City F.C. players
Colchester United F.C. players
Bradford City A.F.C. players
Plymouth Argyle F.C. players
English Football League players
Association football wingers
Republic of Ireland youth international footballers
Republic of Ireland expatriate association footballers
Expatriate footballers in England
Irish expatriate sportspeople in England
Black Irish sportspeople
Republic of Ireland under-21 international footballers